The Russia national youth handball team is the national under–18 handball team of Russia. Controlled by the Russian Handball Federation, that is an affiliate of the International Handball Federation IHF as well as a member of the European Handball Federation EHF, The team represented Russia in international matches.

In reaction to the 2022 Russian invasion of Ukraine, the International Handball Federation banned Russian and Belarus athletes and officials, and the European Handball Federation suspended the national teams of Russia and Belarus as well as Russian and Belarusian clubs competing in European handball competitions. Referees, officials, and commission members from Russia and Belarus will not be called upon for future activities. And new organisers will be sought for the YAC 16 EHF Beach Handball EURO and the Qualifier Tournaments for the Beach Handball EURO 2023, which were to be held in Moscow.

Statistics

Youth Olympic Games 

 Champions   Runners up   Third place   Fourth place

World Championship record
 Champions   Runners up   Third place   Fourth place

EHF European Youth Championship 
 Champions   Runners up   Third place   Fourth place

2021 tournament was under-19. It was held in a move to lessen the COVID-19 pandemic's impact on national team players born in 2002.
Russia was excluded from the 2022 championship after its invasion of Ukraine.

References

External links
World Men's Youth Championship table
European Men's Youth Championship table

 

Handball in Russia
Men's national youth handball teams
Handball